

N04A Anticholinergic agents

N04AA Tertiary amines
N04AA01 Trihexyphenidyl
N04AA02 Biperiden
N04AA03 Metixene
N04AA04 Procyclidine
N04AA05 Profenamine
N04AA08 Dexetimide
N04AA09 Phenglutarimide
N04AA10 Mazaticol
N04AA11 Bornaprine
N04AA12 Tropatepine

N04AB Ethers chemically close to antihistamines
N04AB01 Etanautine
N04AB02 Orphenadrine (chloride)

N04AC Ethers of tropine or tropine derivatives
N04AC01 Benzatropine
N04AC30 Etybenzatropine

N04B Dopaminergic agents

N04BA Dopa and dopa derivatives
N04BA01 Levodopa
N04BA02 Levodopa and decarboxylase inhibitor
N04BA03 Levodopa, decarboxylase inhibitor and COMT inhibitor
N04BA04 Melevodopa
N04BA05 Melevodopa and decarboxylase inhibitor
N04BA06 Etilevodopa and decarboxylase inhibitor
N04BA07 Foslevodopa and decarboxylase inhibitor

N04BB Adamantane derivatives
N04BB01 Amantadine

N04BC Dopamine agonists
N04BC01 Bromocriptine
N04BC02 Pergolide
N04BC03 Dihydroergocryptine mesylate
N04BC04 Ropinirole
N04BC05 Pramipexole
N04BC06 Cabergoline
N04BC07 Apomorphine
N04BC08 Piribedil
N04BC09 Rotigotine

N04BD Monoamine oxidase B inhibitors
N04BD01 Selegiline
N04BD02 Rasagiline
N04BD03 Safinamide

N04BX Other dopaminergic agents
N04BX01 Tolcapone
N04BX02 Entacapone
N04BX03 Budipine
N04BX04 Opicapone

N04C Other antiparkinson drugs

N04CX Other antiparkinson drugs
N04CX01 Istradefylline

References

N04